Weir is an unincorporated community in Kanawha County, West Virginia, United States. Its post office  is called Falling Rock.

The community was named after the Weir family, original owners of the town site.

References 

Unincorporated communities in West Virginia
Unincorporated communities in Kanawha County, West Virginia